Sylva Langova (31 August 1921 – 15 January 2010) was a Czech actress who from the late 1940s lived and worked in England.

Partial filmography

Film

Television

References

External links

1921 births
2010 deaths
Actors from Plzeň
Czech film actresses
Czech television actresses
Czechoslovak emigrants to the United Kingdom
Czechoslovak actresses